The list of shipwrecks in 1930 includes ships sunk, foundered, grounded, or otherwise lost during 1930.

January

1 January

4 January

5 January

6 January

7 January

9 January

10 January

12 January

13 January

14 January

16 January

17 January

21 January

23 January

26 January

27 January

28 January

29 January

30 January

31 January

February

1 February

2 February

3 February

4 February

5 February

7 February

8 February

9 February

10 February

11 February

15 February

16 February

17 February

18 February

19 February

21 February

23 February

25 February

27 February

28 February

March

2 March

3 March

4 March

5 March

7 March

8 March

10 March

11 March

12 March

14 March

15 March

17 March

18 March

20 March

21 March

26 March

27 March

28 March

29 March

30 March

April

2 April

3 April

4 April

5 April

6 April

8 April

10 April

11 April

15 April

17 April

20 April

22 April

23 April

24 April

25 April

26 April

28 April

29 April

30 April

Unknown date

May

2 May

7 May

8 May

9 May

11 May

12 May

13 May

15 May

17 May

18 May

19 May

21 May

22 May

23 May

25 May

28 May

30 May

June

1 June

6 June

8 June

10 June

11 June

13 June

16 June

17 June

18 June

19 June

21 June

23 June

24 June

25 June

26 June

30 June

Unknown date

July

1 July

2 July

4 July

6 July

7 July

8 July

10 July

11 July

12 July

14 July

18 July

19 July

21 July

22 July

23 July

28 July

29 July

30 July

31 July

August

1 August

2 August

3 August

7 August

8 August

9 August

10 August

12 August

13 August

15 August

17 August

18 August

21 August

22 August

23 August

26 August

27 August

28 August

31 August

September

1 September

2 September

3 September

7 September

8 September

9 September

10 September

11 September

13 September

15 September

18 September

19 September

20 September

21 September

22 September

23 September

24 September

25 September

26 September

28 September

29 September

Unknown date

October

2 October

3 October

5 October

6 October

9 October

11 October

13 October

14 October

15 October

16 October

17 October

19 October

21 October

22 October

24 October

25 October

28 October

31 October

November

1 November

2 November

5 November

6 November

7 November

8 November

9 November

10 November

11 November

12 November

13 November

14 November

15 November

16 November

17 November

18 November

19 November

20 November

21 November

23 November

24 November

25 November

29 November

30 November

December

1 December

2 December

3 December

4 December

5 December

7 December

8 December

10 December

11 December

13 December

15 December

16 December

17 December

18 December

19 December

20 December

21 December

22 December

24 December

27 December

29 December

31 December

Unknown date

References

1930
 
Ships